Christian Kinck (23 January 1956 – 15 October 2014) was a French weightlifter. He competed in the men's middleweight event at the 1976 Summer Olympics.

References

1956 births
2014 deaths
French male weightlifters
Olympic weightlifters of France
Weightlifters at the 1976 Summer Olympics
Place of birth missing
20th-century French people